Wonderful Crazy Night is the thirtieth studio album by English musician Elton John. It was released on 5 February 2016. It is John's first album since 2006's The Captain & the Kid to feature the Elton John Band and was written and recorded in 17 days. John's long-standing percussionist, Ray Cooper, makes his first appearance on any of John's albums since Made in England in 1995. This is Kim Bullard's first appearance on keyboards, replacing Guy Babylon, and when Matt Bissonette replaced Bob Birch on bass. The album debuted at number eight on the U.S Billboard 200 with sales of 58,000 album-equivalent units sold.

Critical reception

Wonderful Crazy Night  received generally positive reviews from music critics. At Metacritic, which assigns a normalised rating out of 100 to reviews from mainstream critics, the album received an average score of 70, which indicates "generally favorable reviews", based on 17 reviews.

Accolades

Track listing

Personnel 
 Elton John – acoustic piano, lead vocals
 Kim Bullard – keyboards
 Davey Johnstone – guitars, harmony vocals
 Matt Bissonette – bass, harmony vocals
 Nigel Olsson – drums, harmony vocals
 John Mahon – percussion, harmony vocals
 Ray Cooper – tambourine (3, 5, 8, 9)
 Tom Peterson – baritone saxophone
 Joe Sublett – tenor saxophone
 Jim Thomson – tenor saxophone
 John Grab – trombone 
 Nick Lane – trombone
 William Roper – tuba
 Allen Fogle – French horn
 Dylan Hart – French horn
 Gabe Witcher – horn arrangements and conductor
 Ken Stacey – harmony vocals

Production 
 Producers – Elton John and T Bone Burnett
 Associate producer – Kylie Kempster
 Recorded and mixed by Jason Wormer
 Second engineers – Gabriel Burch, Jeff Gartenbaum, Vanessa Parr and Alex Williams.
 Additional engineer – Vanessa Parr
 Digital editing – Mike Piersante
 Mastered by Gavin Lurssen at Lurssen Mastering (Hollywood, CA).
 Piano technician – Carl Lieberman
 Equipment technician – Rick Salazar
 Production coordinator and contractor – Ivy Skoff
 Photography – Joseph Guay and Juergen Teller
 Art direction and design – Mat Maitland
 Creative directors – Elton John and Toby King

Charts

References

External links

2016 albums
Elton John albums
Albums produced by Elton John
Albums produced by T Bone Burnett
Island Records albums
Mercury Records albums
Virgin EMI Records albums